BiblioBazaar is, with Nabu Press, an imprint of the historical reprints publisher BiblioLife, which is based in Charleston, South Carolina and owned by BiblioLabs LLC.

BiblioBazaar / Nerbles, LLC produced, in printable electronic form, 272,930 titles in 2009, although these were used by means of an automated computerized process, using scanned text and generic stock photography for the covers. They see themselves less as publishers than as a software company.

References

External links
 

Book publishing companies based in South Carolina
Book publishing company imprints